Garra hindii is a species of cyprinid fish found in Africa.

References

 

Cyprinid fish of Africa
hindi
Fish described in 1905